The 2004-05 Top 16 season was the top level of French club rugby in 2004-05. It was the final season under the 16 club format, as the competition became the Top 14 for the 2005-06 season. Biarritz Olympique won the championship, defeating Stade Français Paris in the final at Stade de France. FC Grenoble, Béziers and Auch were relegated to Rugby Pro D2 after the 2004-05 season.

Standings

Semi-finals

Final

See also
 2004-05 Rugby Pro D2
 2004-05 Heineken Cup

External links
 LNR.fr
 Table

Top 14 seasons
   
France